The Minister for Defence is a position in the Luxembourg cabinet.  Among other competences, the Minister for Defence is responsible for overseeing the maintenance and deployment of the armed forces, for veterans, for aiding in the execution of the orders of the Commander-in-Chief, the Grand Duke.

The position has existed since 5 November 1937.  From its creation until 6 February 1969, the position's name was Minister for the Armed Force (Ministre de la Force Armée).  From 1969 until 7 August 1999, the official title of the office was Minister for the Public Force (Ministre de la Force publique).  In 1999, the briefs of international cooperation and humanitarian relief were added to that of defence, creating the office of Minister for Cooperation, Humanitarian Action, and Defence.  In 2004, the positions were separated again, creating the current title.

List of Ministers for Defence

Footnotes

References
 
  

 List
Defence ministries
Defence, Minister for
Luxembourg